Ștefești is a commune in Prahova County, Muntenia, Romania. It is composed of three villages: Scurtești, Ștefești and Târșoreni.

References

Communes in Prahova County
Localities in Muntenia